The men's 66 kg competition of the 2013 World Judo Championships was held on August 27.

Medalists

Results

Pool A
First round fights

Pool B

Pool C

Pool D
First round fights

Finals

Repechage

References

External links
 
 Draw

M66
World Judo Championships Men's Half Lightweight